Dave Brown (born 24 August 1973) is a British comedian, designer and photographer. In The Mighty Boosh, he played Bollo the Ape, as well as several other minor characters. He also choreographed the dance routines.

He is originally from Southend in Essex, where he attended South East Essex College (now part of South Essex College) and then Buckinghamshire Chilterns University College (now Buckinghamshire New University), along with Noel Fielding (who plays Vince Noir). He designed the DVD cover for the Mighty Boosh live tour and boxset.

Brown worked with Jimmy Carr during one of his tours as stage hand/photographer.

Brown has photographed many famous comedians showcased at an exhibition called 'Tough Crowd' in December 2012 at The Strand Gallery on 32 John Adam Street (WC2N 6BP). The exhibition includes photos of Jimmy Carr (pictured), Harry Hill, Bill Bailey, Tony Law, Noel Fielding and Lee Mack. Limited edition, signed prints were available to purchase, with all profits going to AfriKids, a charity operating in Ghana to try and alleviate the acute child suffering, for which Brown is an Ambassador.

When asked about this Brown explains: "Comedians are, by their very nature, tough – they have to be. We always see them mucking about with big smiles on their faces, the funny man, the wacky women telling jokes, getting the laughs, the awards, the fame. But before all this, in the early days, when they were starting out, it has to be one of the hardest jobs in the world."

He added: "Travelling to the darkest corners of the country often on their own, all to stand in the corner of a beer stained room on an upturned crate, shouting their hard thought through, well crafted, deeply personal material to six alcoholics and a comatose dog, you don't get much tougher than that!"

"At some point in their careers they've all been heckled by a drunk, dropped by an agent, cancelled on a bill and delivered a punchline to total silence. I want to capture a glimpse of these thick skinned, seriously tough, complex, moody characters and try to show them in a different light to the usual smiley happy go lucky comedy world image we're used to."

References
2. https://www.comedy.co.uk/live/feature/tough_crowd_dave_brown_photo_exhibition/ 

English male comedians
English male television actors
English male voice actors
People from Southend-on-Sea
Alumni of Buckinghamshire New University
Place of birth missing (living people)
Living people
1973 births